The Housewares Design Awards is an American annual product design award competition focused on the housewares industry. The competition was introduced in 2003 by HomeWorld Business, a housewares industry trade publication. 
 
The Housewares Design Awards attracts hundreds of product entries each year. These entries are evaluated by an independent panel of judges made up of designers and retailer buyers, a process managed by the Housewares Design Awards LLC. 

Contest criteria include unique appearance, functionality, positioning, innovative technology or materials, safety, environmental benefits, emotional appeal, social impact and the ability to meet consumer needs.

Twelve “Best in Category” Awards and three “Best of the Best” awards are presented at the gold, silver and bronze levels. The “Green House Design Awards,” which honor eco-friendly housewares products, are also given each year.

Categories 

 Cookware & Bakeware
 Countertop Cooking & Beverage Appliances
 Countertop Food Prep Appliances
 Countertop Kitchenware
 Cutlery
 Floor Care & Cleaning Appliances
 Gadgets & Kitchen Tools
 Home Environment Appliances
 Home Organization, Laundry Care & Non-Electric Cleaning
 Home & Outdoor Décor
 Personal, Health & Garment Care
 Tableware, Serveware & Beverageware

References 

Enna, Renee. "Box grater takes gold at Housewares Design Awards", Chicago Tribune, 5 March 2009.
Jean, Sheryl. "Two Dallas area items - a multi-tasking slow cooker and a medicine bottle opener - are finalists in national Housewares Design Awards", Dallas Morning News, 16 January 2010.
Gray, Rachel. "Pick a Winner", iVillage House Calls, 4 February 2008.
"Prescribe Innovative Design For Stress Relief", HomeWorld Business, 14 September 2011.
"Industry Embraces Housewares Design Awards", HomeWorld Business, 29 September 2003.
"Housewares Design Awards Presents ‘Best In Category’ Winners", HomeWorld Business, 3 February 2011.
"Meco Wins Top Furniture Design Award", Greenville Sun, 11 February 2010.

External links 
 

Design awards